San Pedro is a census-designated place (CDP) in Cameron County, Texas, United States. The population was 530 at the 2010 census. It is part of the Brownsville–Harlingen Metropolitan Statistical Area.

Geography
The community is less than 1 mile northeast of the Rio Grande, which forms the Mexico–United States border.

Demographics
As of the census of 2000, 668 people, 179 households, and 148 families were residing in the CDP. The population density was 269.9 people per square mile (104.0/km2). The 191 housing units  averaged 77.2/sq mi (29.7/km2). The racial makeup of the CDP was 59.58% White, 0.15% African American, and 40.27% from other races. Hispanics or Latinos of any race were 96.56% of the population.

Of the 179 households,  41.3% had children under the age of 18 living with them, 66.5% were married couples living together, 10.6% had a female householder with no husband present, and 16.8% were not families. About 12.8% of all households were made up of individuals, and 7.8% had someone living alone who was 65 years of age or older. The average household size was 3.73, and the average family size was 4.09.

In the CDP, the age distribution was 33.2% under 18, 7.9% from 18 to 24, 28.1% from 25 to 44, 21.6% from 45 to 64, and 9.1% who were 65  or older. The median age was 30 years. For every 100 females, there were 93.1 males. For every 100 females age 18 and over, there were 82.8 males.

The median income for a household in the CDP was $29,531, and for a family was $35,192. Males had a median income of $16,711 versus $12,188 for females. The per capita income for the CDP was $7,287. About 27.3% of families and 27.9% of the population were below the poverty line, including 25.6% of those under age 18 and 29.0% of those age 65 or over.

Education
San Pedro is served by the Brownsville Independent School District.

In addition, South Texas Independent School District operates magnet schools that serve the community.

References

Census-designated places in Cameron County, Texas
Census-designated places in Texas